Christopher Neville may refer to:

Christopher Neville (died 1649), MP for Lewes (UK Parliament constituency)
 Christopher Nevile, MP
Christopher Nevill, cricketer
 Christopher Nevill, 6th Marquess of Abergavenny (born 1955), British peer